Metamorphosis is a live album by jazz saxophonist Arthur Blythe which was recorded at the Brook, New York City in 1977 and released in 1979 on the India Navigation label. The album was released on CD as a compilation with The Grip which was recorded at the same concert.

Reception
The Allmusic review by Scott Yanow awarded the album 4 stars and states "this album features the distinctive altoist Arthur Blythe fairly early in his career".

Track listing
All compositions by Arthur Blythe
 "Duet For Two" -  17:51  
 "Metamorphosis" - 8:00  
 "Shadows" - 7:40
Recorded at the Brook in New York City on February 26, 1977.

Personnel
Arthur Blythe - alto saxophone 
Abdul Wadud - cello
Ahmed Abdullah - trumpet (tracks 2 & 3) 
Bob Stewart - tuba (tracks 2 & 3) 
Steve Reid - drums (tracks 2 & 3)
Muhamad Abdullah - percussion (tracks 2 & 3)

References

Arthur Blythe live albums
1979 live albums
India Navigation live albums